Taghan (also Romanized as Ţāghān and Ţāqān) is a village in Darmian Rural District, in the Central District of Darmian County, South Khorasan Province, Iran. At the 2006 census, its population was 941, in 179 families.

References 

Populated places in Darmian County